Gol Gol-e Sofla (also Romanized as Gol Gol-e Soflá) is a village in Sarab Bagh Rural District, Sarab Bagh District, Abdanan County, Ilam Province, Iran. At the 2006 census, its population was 165, in 27 families. The village is populated by Kurds.

References 

Populated places in Abdanan County
Kurdish settlements in Ilam Province